Gilles Lalay (21 March  1962 – 7 January  1992) was a French professional motorcycle enduro and rally raid competitor.

Biography
Lalay was born in Peyrat-le-Château, France. One of the world's best enduro riders during the 80s, he was 10 times enduro Champion of France, and 9 times ISDE winner. He won the motorcycle section of the Dakar Rally in 1989. He also won the motorcycle section of the Atlas Rally in 1986, 1987 and 1989, and the Djerba 500 Rally in 1984. In 1985 as France presented no team for the ISDE held in Spain, he engaged as an individual and won the race on his private Honda 250 CR.

He died on January 7, 1992, in Lumombo, Congo, in a collision with one of the organisation vehicles during the Dakar Rally race.

Rally Dakar
Lalay complete results are in the Dakar Historic Book.

References

External links
 Gilles Lalay profile 

1962 births
1992 deaths
Sportspeople from Haute-Vienne
French motorcycle racers
Enduro riders
Off-road racing drivers
Dakar Rally motorcyclists
Dakar Rally winning drivers
Off-road motorcycle racers
Motorcycle racers who died while racing